The Earl M. Vickers Bridge, also known as the Montgomery Bridge is a steel thru truss bridge over the Kanawha River in West Virginia.  It connects West Virginia Route 61 in Montgomery to U.S. Route 60 near Smithers.  The bridge opened in 1956.  It carries the unsigned highway West Virginia Route 6.

References

External links
 

006
State highways in the United States shorter than one mile
Transportation in Fayette County, West Virginia
Buildings and structures in Fayette County, West Virginia
Transportation in Kanawha County, West Virginia
Buildings and structures in Kanawha County, West Virginia
Kanawha River
Road bridges in West Virginia
Bridges completed in 1956